In enzymology, a glucosylglycerol-phosphate synthase is an enzyme that catalyzes the chemical reaction

ADP-glucose + sn-glycerol 3-phosphate  2-(beta-D-glucosyl)-sn-glycerol 3-phosphate + ADP

Thus, the two substrates of this enzyme are ADP-glucose and sn-glycerol 3-phosphate, whereas its two products are 2-(beta-D-glucosyl)-sn-glycerol 3-phosphate and ADP.

This enzyme belongs to the family of glycosyltransferases, specifically the hexosyltransferases.  The systematic name of this enzyme class is ADP-glucose:sn-glycerol-3-phosphate 2-beta-D-glucosyltransferase.

References

 
 

EC 2.4.1
Enzymes of unknown structure